Baudot may refer to:

People:

Marc Antoine Baudot (1765-1837), deputy during the French Revolution
Émile Baudot (1845-1903), French telegraph engineer, inventor of the Baudot code
Anatole de Baudot (1834-1915), French architect

Technology:

Baudot code, a way to encode characters for sending over a communication channel